Let Me Love You is the second studio album by Australian singer-songwriter Mark Holden. The album was released in October 1976 and peaked at number 20 on The Australian Charts. The album was certified Gold for more than 50,000 copies in Australia.

Background and release
In early 1976, Holden received a call from Colin Petersen, EMI Music Australia's A&R representative, who suggested he cover Eric Carmen's "Never Gonna Fall in Love Again". In his 2017 autobiography, Holden said "This was a watershed moment, the opportunity to do covers versus originals. I didn't have a lot of new material. I was a greasy-haired folkie hippie, and the first album had sucked up everything I'd done... Recording "Never Gonna Fall in Love Again" was a chance for me to have a hit".
The song peaked at number 13 on the Australian Kent Music Report, which was followed up by "I Wanna Make You My Lady", an English-version of the Swedish song "Jag ska fånga en ängel" by Ted Gärdestad, which peaked at number 11.

Track listing

Charts

References

Mark Holden albums
1976 albums
EMI Records albums
Pop albums by Australian artists